Coresthetopsis is a genus of longhorn beetles of the subfamily Lamiinae, containing the following species:

 Coresthetopsis arachne (Fauvel, 1906)
 Coresthetopsis proxima Breuning, 1940

References

Parmenini